Luigi di Savoia may refer to:

 Prince Luigi Amedeo, Duke of the Abruzzi
 Italian cruiser Luigi di Savoia Duca degli Abruzzi
 Luigi di Savoia, Libya, the Italian name of the Libyan town Al Abraq, Libya, named after the duke
 Savoia Peak or Luigi de Savoia Peak, named after the duke
 Mount Luigi di Savoia ninth highest peak in Africa